This was the first season ateam handball ranking for the men's clubs was created.

Legend

USA Top 5

References

Handball in the United States